"Live at Planet Rock Xmas Party" is the first of a planned series of 'official bootlegs' by Northern Irish rock band The Answer. It was recorded live at the Islington Academy in London on 11 December 2007 for the radio station Planet Rock. During the concert Paul Rodgers joined the band on stage to sing two songs, "I'm a Mover" and "The Hunter", from his former band Free's debut album Tons of Sobs with the group.

The CD was limited to only 1,500 copies and was exclusively available for purchase through the band's website and at live concerts.

Track listing

Personnel
Cormac Neeson - Lead vocals
Paul Mahon - Guitar
Micky Waters - Bass
James Heatley - Drums
Paul Rodgers - Guest vocals on track 6 and track 9

References

The Answer (band) albums
2008 live albums